Reinhold Johan von Fersen (1646, Tallinn – 1716, Stockholm) was the governor of Västerbotten County from 1688 to 1692 and of Halland County from 1705 to 1710. His son was Hans Reinhold Fersen (1683–1736).

1646 births
1716 deaths
Politicians from Tallinn
Baltic-German people
Governors of Halland County
Governors of Västerbotten County
Swedish nobility
17th-century Swedish politicians
17th-century Estonian people
18th-century Estonian people
Reinhold Johan von